Edi Nijam is a 1956 Indian Telugu-language film directed by Vainik and film personality S. Balachander and produced by Ghantasala Krishnamurthy of Pratibha Films. The films starring Nagabhushanam of Rakta Kanneeru fame. The story is loosely based on the Italian film Puzitor. The film was dubbed into Tamil as Edhu Nijam (1956).

The plot
Kotayya (Nagabhushanam) is a labourer in a small village. He affectionately marries Raami (Janaki) and is living happily. The village Munasabu (Gummadi) is a cutthroat and cheat. He is closely assisted by Naatu Vaidyudu (Ramana Reddy) and Poojari (Vangara). Tirupati (Joga Rao), friend of Kotayya is a very angry man and used to criticize Munasabu openly. Munasabu tries to get Rami into his control by different ways. Tirupati opposes him. Munasabu cunningly kills him in a forest and blames the crime on Kotayya. This results in Kotayya going to jail. Returning from jail, Kotayya knows the truth and attacks Munasabu. Police arrest him while he is hiding in the forest.

Cast

Soundtrack
 "Beedala Rodana Vinava Nirupedala Vedana Kanava" (Singer: Jikki Krishnaveni)
 "Edi Nijam Manavudaa Edi Nijam" (Singers: Ghantasala, Madhavapeddi Satyam and group)
 "Guttonkai Kooroyi Baava" (Singer: Jikki Krishnaveni)
 "Nedu Naamanasu Uyyalaloogene" (Singer: Jikki Krishnaveni)

Awards
 National Film Awards
 1956 - National Film Award for Best Feature Film in Telugu - Certificate of Merit

References

External links
 

1956 films
1950s Telugu-language films
Indian black-and-white films
Films directed by S. Balachander
Films scored by Master Venu
Indian drama films
1956 drama films